The Poltava Battalion is a Ukrainian battalion that is part of the Special Tasks Patrol Police, subordinate to the Ministry of Internal Affairs. The unit is composed of approximately 300 policemen ages ranging between 18–45. Various charity organizations in Ukraine have donated basic supplies and provide medical care for the volunteers of the battalion.

In July 2014 the battalion was sent to participate in the War in Donbass.

On 5 September 2014, the "Myrnyi" police company was merged into the "Poltava" police battalion.

History 
In May 2014, the Ministry of Internal Affairs of Ukraine in the Poltava region has formed three string divisions of the patrol police patrol service: Kaskad Battalion, Poltava's mouth and the mouth "Kremenchuk". In June, the "Cascade" and the mouth "Poltava", were merged into one unit, which was named - BPSMOP "Poltava", numbering a total of 300 people under the leadership of Commander Alexander Fedorenko.

To be admitted to the Community Procedure Service, the Paltava battalion required the completion of a 52-hour course of basic training in the Poltava Center for Professional Training. . The head of the Public Relations Department of the Poltava Ministry of Internal Affairs, Colonel of Police Yuriy Sulayev noted that the battalion employees were provided with the necessary ammunition: arms, armor, helmets, two collections of black form and a collection of camouflage. Part of the ammunition was preserved in warehouses that led to an undesirable.

Participation in ATO 
On July 18, the operational group of the battalion "Poltava" went to the first service business trip to the fighting zone in the east of Ukraine.

On August 20, the second operational group of the battalion "Poltava" arrived for the service to the district of conducting an anti-terrorist operation in the Donetsk region under Gorlovka. From there, Poltava was transferred to the village of Communards near Makeyevka to strengthen the 25th brigade. From August 24 to September 4, the positions of special assessments of the battalion every day fired from heavy artillery; In the course of the fighting of two Poltava, it was injured. On September 4, 29 special certificates left without an order in Artemivsk, 24 fighters remained in the commune.

Reorganization 
On September 5, 2014, the Minister of Internal Affairs of Ukraine Arsen Avakov issued an order by which the BPSMOP "Poltava" and the mouth of the patrol service of a special purpose (RPSMOP) "Peaceful", which at that time was formed in Poltava, were united in the battalion "Poltava region". The commander of the new battalion was appointed coordinator of RPSMOP "Peaceful" Illia Kyva, who received the rank of Major Militia. The head of the GUMVS Poltava region Ivan Korsun confirmed the order of Arsen Avakov. Illia Kyva manages the Poltava Center of the Right Sector, as well as the regional political leader of the "right sector" in the east of Ukraine (Poltava, Kharkiv, Donetsk, and Lugansk region).

On September 8, 2014, representatives of the Poltava community and separate fighters of the former BPSMOP "Poltava" organized a rally near the GUMVS of the Poltava region, which expressed its dissatisfaction with the appointment of Illia Kyva to a new post.

Battalion "Poltavshchyna" 
After reformatting the battle battalion "Poltavshchina" began to prepare for a trip to the ATO zone scheduled on September 15, 2014. They passed through additional training and combatance in the former children's camp of the international importance of "Vasilok" near Volovach village, Poltava region, and on the landfill near the village of Vakulets in Leninsky district of Poltava. The commander of the battalion of Kiva in an interview with Poltava television reported that instructors from Israel, who were previously prepared by such well-known volunteers units as "BOP" Donbass "" of the National Guard of Ukraine and PBMOP "Dnipro-1" later, The press was notified that the sending of the fighters "Poltavshchyna" in the ATO zone to Donbass was postponed.

September 29 is provided with all the necessary operational group of the battalion "Poltavanschina" took place in a service business trip to the ATO zone for one month.

According to a rally arranged by the battalion against the leadership of Ilya Kviva, an order A. Avakov Ilya Kyva was released from this post, and the battalion "Poltavshchina" is disbanded, and from his personnel distinguished separately a battalion special appointment of "Poltava" of about 275 people. The commander of the newly created battalion "Poltava" was appointed Yuriy Anuchin, a well-known machine gunner of a volunteer battalion "Azov" with a call "Bear".

See also
List of special law enforcement units

References

History of Poltava Oblast
Military units and formations established in 2014
2014 establishments in Ukraine
Special tasks patrol police of Ukraine